List of battles of the Polish-Soviet War by chronology:

 Soviet "Target Vistula" offensive (January–February 1919)
 Battle of Bereza Kartuska (February 9, 1919: the first battle of the conflict)
 Vilna offensive: Polish offensive to Vilna (April 1919)
 First Battle of Lida (April 1919)
 Battle of Berezina (1919)
 Operation Minsk: Polish offensive to Minsk (July–August 1919)
 Battles of Chorupań and Dubno (19 July 1919)
 Battle of Daugavpils: joint Polish-Latvian operation (3 January 1920)
 Battle of Latyczów (18-22 February 1920)
 Battle of Koziatyn (25–27 April 1920)
 Battle of Czarnobyl (27 April 1920)
 Battle of the Berezina (1920) (15 May 1920)
 Kiev Offensive (May–June 1920)
 Battle of Wołodarka (29 May 1920)
 Battle of Bystryk (31 May 1920)
 Battle of Boryspil (2 June 1920)
 Battle of Borodzianka (11-13 June 1920)
 Battle of Głębokie (4-6 July 1920)
 Battle of Mironówka
 Battle of Olszanica
 Battle of Żywotów
 Battle of Miedwiedówka
 Battle of Dziunków
 Battle of Wasylkowce
 Battle of Grodno (19-20 July 1920)
 Battle of Brody and Berestechko (29 July – 3 August 1920)
 Battle of Serock
 Battle of Ostrołęka (2-6 August 1920)
 Battle of Lwów (July–September 1920)
 Battle of Tarnopol (31 July - 6 August 1920)
 Battle of Warsaw (15 August 1920)
 Battle of Nasielsk, Battle of Radzymin, Battle of Ossów, Battle of Borkowo, Battle of Kock (14–15 August 1920)
 Battle of Cyców (15–16 August 1920)
 Battle of Dęblin and Mińsk Mazowiecki (16–18 August 1920)
 Battle of Zadwórze: the "Polish Thermopylæ" (17 August 1920)
 Battle of Przasnysz (21–22 August 1920)
 Battle of Sarnowa Góra (21–22 August 1920)
 Battle of Białystok (22 August 1920)
 Battle of Zamość (29 August 1920) - Budyonny's attempt to take Zamość
 Battle of Komarów: great cavalry battle, ending in Budyonny's defeat (31 August 1920)
 Battle of Hrubieszów (1 September 1920)
 Battle of Sejny (September 1920)
 Battle of Kobryń (1920) (14–15 September 1920)
 Battle of Dytiatyn (16 September 1920)
 Battle of Brzostowica (20 September 1920)
 Battle of the Niemen River (September 26–28, 1920)
 Battles of Obuchowe and Krwawy Bór (27–28 September 1920)
 Battle of Zboiska
 Battle of Minsk (1920) (18 October 1920)

 
Polish-Soviet War
Battles of the Polish-Soviet War
Soviet